Sperry is an unincorporated community in central Des Moines County, Iowa, United States.  It lies along local roads north of the city of Burlington, the county seat of Des Moines County.  Its elevation is 751 feet (229 m).  Although Sperry is unincorporated, it has a post office with the ZIP code of 52650, which opened on 5 February 1870.

The community is part of the Burlington, IA–IL Micropolitan Statistical Area.

Demographics

History
 Sperry got its start in the year 1869, when John M. Sperry settled there and opened a post office.

Sperry was a station stop on the Burlington, Cedar Rapids and Northern Railway later a part of the Chicago, Rock Island and Pacific Railroad; construction of the line began in 1869.  This line was also used by the Burlington and Northwestern Railway system, later part of the Chicago, Burlington and Quincy Railroad.  All service on the line by both the Rock Island and Burlington systems ended in 1980.

Sperry's population was 88 in 1902, and 75 in 1925.

References

Unincorporated communities in Des Moines County, Iowa
Unincorporated communities in Iowa
Burlington, Iowa micropolitan area